Brusqeulia ceriphora is a species of moth of the family Tortricidae. It is found in Rio de Janeiro, Brazil.

The wingspan is about 12 mm. The ground colour of the forewings is cream, in the basal and terminal areas mixed with brownish pink. The markings are black. The hindwings are brownish cream.

Etymology
The specific name refers to the processes of the transtilla and is derived from Greek cera, from keras (meaning horn) and phoreo (meaning I carry).

References

Moths described in 2011
Brusqeulia
Moths of South America
Taxa named by Józef Razowski